William Henry Loverseed (1876–1914) was an English footballer.

Career
Loverseed played for Newark before joining Burslem Port Vale in June 1902. He was a regular during the 1902–03 season, scoring five goals in 30 games, but never had a particularly lengthy first team spell afterwards. In a 5–0 defeat at Bolton Wanderers on 2 January 1904 he managed to injure himself rather badly in a fall after stepping on the ball. He was released at the end of the 1904–05 season.

Career statistics
Source:

References

1876 births
1914 deaths
People from Basford, Nottinghamshire
Footballers from Nottinghamshire
English footballers
Association football forwards
Newark Town F.C. players
Port Vale F.C. players
English Football League players